Ilari Melart (born February 11, 1989) is a Finnish professional ice hockey defenceman currently playing for Färjestad BK of the Swedish Hockey League (SHL).

Playing career
In 2006–07 he played 10 matches for the A-junior (top youth level in Finland) side and an additional 21 matches for the B-juniors. In 2007-08 he made 21 appearances for the A-juniors, which eventually earned him a spot in the first team. The year before Melart played in the United States for Harwood Union High School in Duxbury, Vermont.

Melart made his first appearance for HIFK's first team on November 13, 2008 away against Tappara. Before joining the first team, Melart played with HIFK's different youth teams.

On May 24, 2013 Melart signed as a free agent with the Columbus Blue Jackets on a one-year entry level contract. Melart moved to North America for the 2013–14 season and was assigned to the Blue Jackets' AHL team, the Springfield Falcons. He scored his first professional goal on November 23 against the Hartford Wolf Pack. After 24 games with the Falcons, and unable to solidify a position on the blueline, Melart opted to be reassigned to the Russian Kontinental Hockey League to play for Yugra Khanty-Mansiysk. In 15 games he scored 1 goal and 5 points as Yugra were unable to qualify for the Gagarin Cup. He then returned to the Falcons on March 25, 2013, to fulfil his contract.

As a restricted free agent with the Blue Jackets, Melart opted to make a permanent return with Yugra of the KHL on May 19, 2014.

Career statistics

Regular season and playoffs

International

References

External links

1989 births
Färjestad BK players
Finnish ice hockey defencemen
HIFK (ice hockey) players
Kiekko-Vantaa players
Living people
Luleå HF players
Springfield Falcons players
HC Yugra players
Ice hockey people from Helsinki